Onallee (also known as Tracey Bowen) is a British vocalist and songwriter best known for being part of Reprazent, a British drum and bass act formed by Roni Size.

In 2016, she produced an audio visual performance called Futurism 3.0 with D Product.

Media 
Appearances:

 Better Living Through Circuitry (1999) - documentary about the United States rave scene

References

External links
Onallee Soundcloud

Living people
English radio DJs
English women singers
English songwriters
Year of birth missing (living people)